Francis Le strange Stone MC (14 June 1886 – 7 October 1938) was an English international rugby union forward who played club rugby for Blackheath and county rugby for London Counties. Stout played international rugby for England on just one occasion but also represented the Barbarians. Stone fought in the British Army during the First World War and was brother to Walter Stone who was awarded the Victoria Cross in the same conflict.

Early life
Stone was born in Lewisham, in 1886 to Edward Stone, a solicitor, and his wife Emily Francis (née Mieville). He was christened at the Church of the Ascension in Blackheath on 21 June. Stone was the sixth of ten siblings, the youngest of whom was Walter Stone. Stone was educated at Harrow School.

References

1886 births
1938 deaths
People educated at Harrow School
English rugby union players
Rugby union number eights
Rugby union players from Lewisham
England international rugby union players
Barbarian F.C. players
Blackheath F.C. players
British Army personnel of World War I
Recipients of the Military Cross